Basket is an unincorporated community in eastern Alsace Township, Berks County, Pennsylvania, United States, approximately eight road miles from downtown Reading. The community is served by the Oley Valley School District.

Unincorporated communities in Berks County, Pennsylvania
Unincorporated communities in Pennsylvania